The Affandi Museum is a museum located in Yogyakarta on Java, Indonesia.

On the bank of the Gajah Wong River on Laksda Adisucipto Street number 167, in 1953 the painter Affandi designed and constructed a home for himself which also functions as a museum to display his paintings, inaugurated on 15 December 1973. His house complex is consist of his private house on stilts, a gallery with his retrospective works, a gifted gallery from the former president Soeharto in which exhibit his sketches and archives of his voyages throughout india, Europe, North America and South America, a three level Building consists of a family and publicly open for rent gallery, a restoration studios, and a basement storage, a semi-open space for public area and a painting Studio for visitors. All the  buildings is uniquely constructed, with a roof that resembles a banana leaf.

The museum has around 250 of Affandi's paintings. The high air humidity and temperature are causing concerns about the condition of the paintings. The Affandi Foundation, which manages the museum, finds it difficult to manage the museum properly, due to a lack of funds and revenue.

Before dying, Affandi spent a lot of time sitting around in his own museum, observing his paintings. He said once, “I want to die in simplicity without giving anyone unnecessary trouble, so I could go home to Him in peace.”

After suffering a complication of illnesses, on Wednesday, the May 23, 1990, Affandi died. He is now buried in the museum complex, as he wished to always be surrounded by his family and his works.

Activities 
The museum's activities studio, Gajah Wong Studio, holds painting classes for kids and adults. There are also workshops and painting demonstrations.

Artworks 
Several Affandi paintings are permanently exhibited in the Affandi Museum:

 Self-portrait, 1938
 Affandi and Kartika (Potret met dochter), 1939
 Nude (My Wife Maryati), 1940
 Kartika Painted Her Father, 1944
 Kids Play With Worm, 1943
 He Comes, Waits and Goes, 1944
 Line Up For Rice in Jakarta, 1948
 The Painter and His Daughter, 1950
 Place de Tertre, 1977
 Self Portrait of Sipping Pipe, 1977
 Embryo, 1988

Alongside this, Affandi also collected paintings from various painter colleagues, such as the works of Sindu Sudjojono, Basuki Abdullah, Amrus Natalsya (sculptures), Barli, Popo Iskandar, Hendra Gunawan and Batara Lubis.

See also
List of single-artist museums

References

External links 
 Homepage

Museums in Yogyakarta
Art museums and galleries in Indonesia
Museums devoted to one artist